Karauli (also formerly spelled Karoli or Kerowlee) is a city located in the Indian state of Rajasthan. It is located in the Braj region. The city is the administrative center of Karauli District, and was formerly the capital of the erstwhile princely state of Karauli. Karauli District comes under Bharatpur Divisional Commissionerate.

Geography
It has an average elevation of 275 metres (902 ft).

Temples
There are four major temples in Karauli district, hence they are called Char Dham of Karauli:
Kaila Devi temple, Kaila devi, Karauli
 Krishna temple, Karauli (Madan Mohan)
 Mehandipur Balaji Temple, Todabhim Karauli
Anjani Mata TempleKarauli,

ग्रामीण क्षेत्र के प्रमुख मंदिर करौली
Nande Bhumia Temple, Tulsipura, Karauli
Sona Bhumia temple,Sahajpur,karauli,
bhaddiye baba temple ,pareeta Karauli,

History

Earlier, Karauli, along with Alwar, was part of the Matsya kingdom, according to the legend of Mahabharata. The modern princely state Karauli was founded in about 995 by Raja Bijai Pal, who is claimed descent from the Hindu god Krishna. His Highness the Maharaja maintains a military force of 281 cavalry, 1640 infantry, and 56 guns, and is entitled to a salute of 17 guns (as of 1892). The Britishers later occupied it, and they ruled up to 1947. The Maharaja's palace is a handsome block of buildings, some of them dating to the mid-18th century. Karauli State was founded by Maharaja Bijaipal in 1348 CE. The dynasty is said to be of Jadaun Rajputs.

A municipality was established at Karauli in 1884.

Monuments

Shri Mahavirji 

Shri Mahavirji is one of the miraculous pilgrimages of Jains. This pilgrimage situated at Hindaun Block in Karauli district. Built at the bank of a river, this pilgrimage is a prominent centre of devotion for Jain devotees. The temple is known for its idol of Lord Mahavira, the principal deity of the pilgrimage temple. Jaipur rulers provided grants for the management of this temple.

Shri Mahavirji is ornamented with many pinnacles. This temple is surrounded by Dharmashalas. The exterior and interior walls of the temple are decorated with carvings and golden paintings. Shantinath Jinalaya is also present near this temple, the main attraction of the temple is an imposing 32 ft high image of Lord Shantinath, the 16th Jain tirthankar.

Kaila Devi Temple 

Kaila Devi (Goddess) temple is located on the banks of the Kalisil river in Karauli district. The temple is devoted to the tutelary deity, goddess Kaila, of the erstwhile princely rulers of the Karauli state. It is marble structures with a large courtyard of a checkered floor. In one place are a number of red flags planted by devotees. A fair is held here during the dark half of Chaitra (March–April), which lasts for a fortnight.

In the sanctum sanctorum, there are two idols. The idol of Kaila Devi is slightly reclined as the neck of the goddess is bent. The idols are very old and they are made of the locally available stone. The temple is a fine example of medieval architecture. The shikhar is very high, like a pyramid. The Jagmohan or the prayer hall is also the same. The ornamental work, engraving and encarving have been done on walls and pillars. The temple stands on a rocky elevation.

Demographics

As of 2011 India census, Karauli had a population of 82,960. Males constitute 53% of the population and females 47%. Karauli has an average literacy rate of 53%, lower than the national average of 59.5%. Male literacy is 65%, and female literacy is 41%. In Karauli, 19% of the population is under 6 years of age.

References

External links

Karauli District website

Cities and towns in Karauli district